Robert Allen Liddington (born September 15, 1948) is a Canadian retired professional ice hockey player who played 11 games in the National Hockey League and 348 games in the World Hockey Association between 1970 and 1977. He played for the Toronto Maple Leafs, Chicago Cougars, Houston Aeros, Denver Spurs, Ottawa Civics, and Phoenix Roadrunners.

Career statistics

Regular season and playoffs

References

External links
 

1948 births
Living people
Binghamton Dusters players
Calgary Buffaloes players
Calgary Centennials players
Canadian expatriate ice hockey players in the United States
Canadian ice hockey left wingers
Chicago Cougars players
Denver Spurs (WHA) players
Houston Aeros (WHA) players
Ice hockey people from Calgary
Long Beach Sharks players
Ottawa Civics players
Phoenix Roadrunners (PHL) players
Phoenix Roadrunners (WHA) players
Phoenix Roadrunners (WHL) players
Toronto Maple Leafs players
Tucson Mavericks players
Tulsa Oilers (1964–1984) players
Undrafted National Hockey League players